George H. Vehslage House is a historic home located at Seymour, Jackson County, Indiana.  It was built in 1894, and is a -story, Queen Anne style brick dwelling with a limestone foundation.  It features a corner tower with a hexagonal roof, irregular floorplan, and one-story full width front porch with ornate woodwork.  Also on the property is a two-story carriage house.

It was listed on the National Register of Historic Places in 2010.

References

Houses on the National Register of Historic Places in Indiana
Colonial Revival architecture in Indiana
Houses completed in 1894
Buildings and structures in Jackson County, Indiana
National Register of Historic Places in Jackson County, Indiana